Monarch Cablesystems, LTD. is a now-defunct cable television and internet service provider in British Columbia and portions of Alberta in Western Canada, and also operates Monarch TV-10, a community channel on Cable 10. Monarch was founded in the 1960s, and had expanded throughout Northern and Eastern British Columbia, with portions of service extending into southern Alberta as well.  In 1976, Monarch had expanded into broadcasting by purchasing CBC Television affiliate CKRD-TV in Red Deer, Alberta under its newly created Monarch Broadcasting division. The station would later be sold to Allarcom in 1989. Monarch Broadcasting would later purchase Prince George, British Columbia's CKPG-TV in 1990 from Q Broadcasting, Ltd. The station, along with the entire Monarch Broadcasting division would be sold to Jim Pattison Broadcasting group, a division of the Jim Pattison Group on December 21, 2000. On October 1, 2007, Monarch was sold to Prince Rupert, British Columbia's CityTel and merged into its CityWest system, with its southern and Alberta portions of service being sold to Shaw Communications.

See also 
 CityWest

External links 
 Monarch.net (redirects to citywest.ca)

Companies based in Alberta
Companies based in British Columbia
Telecommunications companies of Canada
Companies formerly owned by municipalities of Canada
Defunct cable and DBS companies of Canada
Companies disestablished in 2007
Prince Rupert, British Columbia
2007 mergers and acquisitions
2007 disestablishments in British Columbia
Telecommunications companies disestablished in 2007